Goniodoma millierella is a moth of the family Coleophoridae. It is found in France, Italy and Tunisia.

References

Coleophoridae
Moths of Europe
Moths of Africa
Moths described in 1882